This is a list of electoral results for the electoral district of Port Fairy and Glenelg in Victorian state elections.

Members for Port Fairy and Glenelg

Election results

Elections in the 1940s

 Ernie Bond had been elected as an Independent in 1937 and joined the Labor party before the election.

Elections in the 1930s

 Preferences were not distributed.

Elections in the 1920s

 Preferences were not distributed.

References

Victoria (Australia) state electoral results by district